Snooker world rankings 1999/2000: The professional world rankings for the top 64 snooker players in the 1999–00 season are listed below.

References

1999
Rankings 2000
Rankings 1999